The Elkhorn Municipal Building is located in Elkhorn, Wisconsin. It was added to the National Register of Historic Places in 2012.

History
The building was constructed at a cost of $73,000. It originally housed the light and water commission.

References

Buildings and structures in Walworth County, Wisconsin
Government buildings on the National Register of Historic Places in Wisconsin
Government buildings completed in 1931
National Register of Historic Places in Walworth County, Wisconsin
Elkhorn, Wisconsin